The Picnic is a 1930 American animated short film directed by Burt Gillett and produced by Walt Disney. It was first released on October 9, 1930, as part of the Mickey Mouse film series. It was the twenty-third Mickey Mouse short to be produced, the eighth of that year.

The cartoon is notable as the first appearance of a pet dog called "Rover", an early version of a character that was renamed Pluto six months later, in the April 1931 cartoon The Moose Hunt.

Plot
Mickey arrives at Minnie's house to take her out for a picnic. Minnie asks if she can bring her "little Rover", although Rover turns out to be a huge bloodhound the size of Mickey. The mice tie Rover to the back of the car and drive to the picnic spot, but along the way, Rover spies a pair of rabbits and gives chase, dragging the car behind him. Rover chases one rabbit through a series of rabbit holes, but the rabbit pulls the final hole away, and the dog bangs his head on the ground, dazing Rover.

Mickey and Minnie set up for the picnic, and Mickey cranks up the portable gramophone. The mice dance to "In the Good Old Summertime", but the birds and squirrels are active too, swiping the picnic food while Mickey and Minnie are dancing. Rover follows his nose until he finds Mickey, just as a stormcloud bursts and begins to pour. Mickey gathers up the food and the gramophone—both overrun with animals and bugs—and the three friends jump into the car. Rover's tail acts as a windshield wiper as Mickey and Minnie drive home through the rain.

Production
The dog, called "Rover" in this cartoon, is an important step towards the creation of Pluto as a major character in the series. Animator Norm Ferguson first drew a pair of bloodhounds in the August 1930 Mickey Mouse short The Chain Gang, and Rover is clearly a continuation of that idea, even featuring a recycled gag from that picture in which one of the dogs sniffs into the camera. (The same gag would be reused in 1931's The Moose Hunt and 1939's The Pointer.)

Gijs Grob says in Mickey's Movies: The Theatrical Films of Mickey Mouse:

The dog returned as Pluto six months later in The Moose Hunt, and became so popular that he got his own series in 1937, starting with Pluto's Quintuplets.

In January 1931, Floyd Gottfredson drew a week-long adaptation of The Picnic in the Mickey Mouse comic strip. In the strip, the dog's name was "Tiny", and didn't bear as much resemblance to the final Pluto design as "Rover" did. Pluto appeared in the strip six months later, on July 8.

Voice actors
 Mickey Mouse: Walt Disney
 Minnie Mouse: Marcellite Garner
 Rover: Lee Millar

Reception
Motion Picture News (November 29, 1930): "Diverting. Mickey Mouse gets himself nicely messed up in a picnic. What the birds ants and whatnot do to the food is just too bad for Mickey, but perfectly swell insofar as the audience and its inclination to laugh is concerned. Produced in his usual, inimitable style by Walt Disney."

The Film Daily (December 7, 1930): "Pip Cartoon. There seems to be no end to the original antics and laugh-producing stunts emanating from the Walt Disney workshops and performed by the sprightly Mickey Mouse and his chief co-worker, Minnie Mouse. This latest number is in the pip class and not only stirs up loud merriment but even elicits a healthy round of applause, which is some tribute considering that the public has been regaled with a considerable quantity of cartoon comedies in the past year or so. In the present subject Mickey takes his Minnie for a picnic in the woods, where they disport themselves while the animals of the forest raid their lunch, until a rainstorm chases all of them to cover."

Home media
The short was released on December 7, 2004 on Walt Disney Treasures: Mickey Mouse in Black and White, Volume Two: 1929-1935.

Television
The short appeared on the following TV anthologies:

 The Mickey Mouse Club (Season 1, Episode 99)
 The Mickey Mouse Club (Season 2, Episode 66)
 Mickey's Mouse Tracks (Season 1, Episode 55)

See also
Mickey Mouse (film series)

References

External links
 
 

Mickey Mouse short films
1930s Disney animated short films
1930 short films
American black-and-white films
1930s English-language films
1930 animated films
1930 films
Films produced by Walt Disney
American comedy short films
Columbia Pictures short films
Columbia Pictures animated short films
Films directed by Burt Gillett
Picnic films
1930s American films